Not to be confused with Mauritania

Mauritiana is a genus of lichenized fungi in the family Halotthiaceae.

References

Pyrenulales
Lichen genera
Taxa named by André Aptroot
Eurotiomycetes genera